Challenge Bank was an Australian bank. It was established in April 1987 when the Hotham Permanent Building Society of Victoria and Perth Building Society of Western Australia merged.

In December 1995 it was purchased by Westpac. In May 1996, the Victorian business was sold to the Bank of Melbourne that in turn was purchased by Westpac in 1997. The Challenge Bank brand was retired in the early 2000s.

References

Banks established in 1987
Companies based in Perth, Western Australia
Companies formerly listed on the Australian Securities Exchange
Defunct banks of Australia
Westpac
1987 establishments in Australia